Raphael Shore is a Canadian-Israeli film writer, producer, and rabbi. He is the founder of OpenDor Media, a Jewish educational organization, and Clarion Project, whose stated mission is "exposing the dangers of Islamist extremism".

Early life and education
Shore is the twin brother of Ephraim Shore, the former head of HonestReporting and younger brother of television producer and writer David Shore. Shore has a Bachelor of Arts from the University of Toronto, Ontario.

Career
Shore previously worked for Aish HaTorah, an Orthodox organization devoted to promoting Jewish learning, and has collaborated with HonestReporting, a pro-Israel media watchdog site formerly run by his brother Ephraim.

Film producer
In 2010, Shore self-released the documentary film, Crossing the Line: The Intifada Comes to Campus.

Shore wrote and produced the documentary films Relentless: The Struggle for Peace in the Middle East, Obsession: Radical Islam's War Against the West, The Third Jihad: Radical Islam's Vision for America, and IRANIUM. He has been described as a figure at the center of the counter-jihad movement or the "Islamophobia industry".

Shore's documentary, Obsession, was distributed to 28 million voters throughout the United States during the 2008 United States presidential campaign. Shore has declined to reveal who funded both the production of the film or dissemination of the DVDs.

Shore produced the 2012 documentary Israel Inside: How a Small Nation Makes a Big Difference, narrated by Tal Ben-Shahar. The film explores parts of Israeli history and society that tend not to be addressed in mainstream coverage of the country.

Notes

References

Canadian emigrants to Israel
Canadian Orthodox rabbis
Canadian male screenwriters
Counter-jihad activists
Israeli Orthodox rabbis
Israeli film producers
Film producers from Ontario
Jewish Canadian writers
Israeli male screenwriters
Canadian twins
Living people
Year of birth missing (living people)
Jewish Canadian filmmakers
21st-century Canadian screenwriters
21st-century Canadian male writers